The MV Kittitas is an  operated by Washington State Ferries.

History
The Kittitas was built in 1980, as the second . When delivered it acted as a relief boat until it was moved to the Mukilteo–Clinton route in the mid 1980s.  In 1990, in order to keep up with growing demand, the Kittitas underwent a capacity expansion by adding additional vehicle areas above the vehicle areas along the outside edge of the ferry. These upgrades had been planned for in the original design of the vessels. The ferry's passenger cabin was updated in the late 1990s. Included in the upgrades were the removal of many tables located in the passenger cabin to allow for the bench seats to be spaced closer together in some sections of the ship. The galley area was also upgraded and each ship was given a unique look. The original color on the Kittitas was yellow, and her new colors are a mix of turquoise and orange.

References

External links
 

Washington State Ferries vessels
1980 ships
Ships built in Seattle